Herts and Middlesex Wildlife Trust manages over 40 nature reserves covering nearly  north of London, in Hertfordshire and the historic county of Middlesex, part of which is divided between the London boroughs of Barnet, Enfield, Harrow and Hillingdon. It has over 21,000 members, and is one of 46 Wildlife Trusts across the UK. It is a Registered Charity, with its Registered Office in St Albans, and had an income in the year to 31 March 2014 of over £1.5 million.

The trust's activities include managing nature reserves, advising landowners on how to manage their land for wildlife, commenting on planning applications, advising planning authorities and campaigning to protect wildlife. The trust also encourages people to be active volunteers helping to maintain nature reserves.

The first preparatory meeting of what was to become the trust was held on 16 November 1963, and the Hertfordshire & Middlesex Trust for Nature Conservation was incorporated on 9 October 1964. By 1970 it had twenty reserves and in the same year it took over management of its first Site of Special Scientific Interest (SSSI), Blagrove Common. In 1987 it changed its name to the Herts and Middlesex Wildlife Trust. In 2007 it purchased Amwell Quarry, and started restoration which has now made the site internationally important for its wetland birds.

Two of the trust's nature reserves are Ramsar sites, internationally important wetland reserves; fifteen are SSSIs, and five are Local Nature Reserves. The first site was Fox Covert, donated by Mr Fordham of Letchworth on the trust's foundation in 1964. The smallest is Alpine Meadow at 0.8 hectares, which has been designated an SSSI as an example of unimproved chalk grassland.

Nature reserves

Key

Designations
LNR = Local Nature Reserve
Ramsar = Internationally important wetland site
RIGS = Regionally Important Geological Site
SPA = Special Protection Area
SSSI = Site of Special Scientific Interest

Access
 YES   = Free public access to all or most of the site
 NO   = No public access 
 PO   = Access with permit only
 NF   = No footpaths
 VO   = Viewing only
 WTO  = Wildlife Trust members only

Sites formerly managed by the trust
Barkway Chalk Pit 
Broad Colney Lakes
Darland's Lake Nature Reserve
Hill End Pit
Marshalls Heath
Pryor's Wood
Rowley Green Common
Sawbridgeworth Marsh
Telegraph Hill

See also
List of Local Nature Reserves in Hertfordshire
List of Sites of Special Scientific Interest in Hertfordshire

Notes

References

External links

 

Wildlife Trusts of England
Charities based in Hertfordshire
Middlesex

Hertfordshire-related lists